The 1987 winners of the Torneo di Viareggio (in English, the Viareggio Tournament, officially the Viareggio Cup World Football Tournament Coppa Carnevale), the annual youth football tournament held in Viareggio, Tuscany, are listed below.

Format
The 16 teams are seeded in 4 groups. Each team from a group meets the others in a single tie. The winner of each group progress to the final knockout stage.

Participating teams
Italian teams

  Atalanta
  Avellino
  Bologna
  Fiorentina
  Genoa
  Inter Milan
  Lanerossi Vicenza
  Milan
  Napoli
  Roma
  Sampdoria
  Torino

European teams

  Dukla Prague
  Bayern Munich
  Dinamo Zagreb

American teams
  Platense

Group stage

Group A

Group B

Group C

Group D

Knockout stage

Champions

Footnotes

External links
 Official Site (Italian)
 Results on RSSSF.com

1983
1986–87 in Italian football
1986–87 in German football
1986–87 in Yugoslav football
1986–87 in Czechoslovak football
1986–87 in Argentine football